Panjiri is a North Indian dish which is made from whole-wheat flour fried in sugar and ghee, heavily laced with dried fruits and herbal gums. It is eaten by women after giving birth as a nutritional supplement, to promote healing and lactation, or eaten in general in the winters to ward off cold. Its usage is culturally and traditionally meaningful.

It is consumed in North Indian states of Punjab, Haryana, Rajasthan, Gujarat Jammu, Himachal Pradesh, Bihar, and Uttar Pradesh.

Etymology 
The term panjīrī is ultimately from Sanskrit elements panch (five) and jīraka (cumin). Panjiri is prepared by roasting wheat flour in Ghee and adding dry fruits and spices like Jeera (cumin), Dhaniya (coriander), Saunth (Dry Ginger powder) etc.

Other uses

Panjiri is popular across north India, and is often prepared as a Prasad in Hindu prayers during Krishna Janamashtami and Satyanarayan Puja.

Ingredients
 Atta (whole wheat flour) or sooji can also be used
 Ghee
 Chaar magaz (melon seeds)
 Sugar
 Almond
 Powdered edible gum crystals (gondh)
 Flame-of-the-forest (kamarkas)
 Fennel seeds (Saunf)
 puffed lotus seeds (makhane)
 carom seeds (ajwain)
 powdered cardamom seeds (elaichi)
 powdered dried ginger powder (saunth)
 walnut (akhrot)
 Figs (anjeer)
 unsalted pistachio nuts (pista)
 powdered sugar (boora)

Cooking method
 Heat 500 gm ghee ( clarified butter ) in a heavy bottomed kadai.
 Fry all the dry fruits one by one till they turn golden brown, first almonds, then cashew nuts, walnuts, pistachio nuts, lotus seeds, and lastly, melon seeds. Keep them aside.
 In the same ghee, fry the kamarkas, and keep them aside as well.
 Next, roast the grated coconut and keep it aside.
 Now, coarsely grind all the fried dry fruits, except the melon seeds. Mix the dry fruits, roasted coconut and melon seeds together in a large pan and keep aside. Grind the kamarkas into fine powder and keep them aside as well.
 Heat the remaining ghee and roast flour over medium heat till the colour of the flour changes to golden brown and the ghee starts separating.
 Turn down the flame at this point and sprinkle in powdered gum crystals. Keep stirring the mixture until the crystals puff up and the spluttering stops.
 Add the powdered saunth and ajwain to the roasted flour and stir the whole mixture until all the ingredients are well blended.
 Turn off the flame. Keep on stirring the mixture for another 5–10 minutes.
 Now add the dry fruits, magaz, sugar and kamarkas to the roasted flour and mix well. Transfer the mixture to a large dish or tray and let cool.
 Store the mixture in an airtight container.

See also
Satyanarayan Puja
Krishna Janamashtami 
North Indian Cuisine 
Indian cuisine

References

 Panjiri

Indian desserts
Indian cuisine
Punjabi cuisine